The 1966 Australia Cup Final was the fifth Australia Cup Final, the final match of the 1966 Australia Cup. It was played at Wentworth Park in Sydney, Australia, on 30 October 1966, contested by APIA Leichhardt and Sydney Hakoah. APIA won the match 2–0, with one goal each from Ricardo Campana and Bill Kerklaan.

Route to the final

APIA Leichhardt

Sydney Hakoah

Match

Details

References

October 1966 sports events in Australia
Soccer in Sydney
Australia Cup (1962–1968) finals